The 2015 Gagarin Cup playoffs of the Kontinental Hockey League (KHL) began on February 27, 2015, with the top eight teams from each of the conferences, after the conclusion of the 2014–15 KHL regular season.

Playoff seeds
After the regular season, the standard 16 teams qualified for the playoffs. The CSKA Moscow became the Western Conference regular season champions and Continental Cup winners with 139 points. The Ak Bars Kazan were the Eastern Conference regular season champions, finishing the season with 120 points. New addition Jokerit made the playoffs in its first season in the KHL.

Draw
The playoffs began on February 27, 2015, with the top eight teams from each of the conferences., and ended with the last game of the Gagarin Cup final.

Player statistics

Scoring leaders 

  
GP = Games played; G = Goals; A = Assists; Pts = Points; +/– = Plus-minus; PIM = Penalty minutes

Leading goaltenders 

GP = Games played; Min = Minutes played; W = Wins; L = Losses; SOP = Shootouts played; GA = Goals against; SO = Shutouts; SV% = Save percentage; GAA = Goals against average

References

2014–15 KHL season
Gagarin Cup